Voice of Indonesia (also known as RRI World Service – Voice of Indonesia, abbreviated as VOI) is an autonomous division under Radio Republik Indonesia (RRI), an Indonesian public radio service. It is a national radio station that broadcasts all over Indonesia and abroad to serve all Indonesia citizens anywhere in the country and abroad. RRI also provides information about Indonesia to people around the world. Voice of Indonesia is the division for abroad broadcasting. As an autonomous division, VOI has its own independent structure so it can find their own financial resources through marketing.

History
When Indonesia declared its independence on 17 August 1945, the new country needed an effective tool to announce its declaration of independence to the whole nation and to the world audience. At 19:00 on the same day, M. Jusuf Ronodipuro, founder of the RRI, has read the proclamation of news on Hoso Kyoku, Japanese occupation Radio. He was also supported by Dr. Abdulrahman Saleh, who had a passion for radio broadcasting. Both of them then launched the Voice of Free Indonesia on 23 August 1945. The first Indonesian President Sukarno delivered a speech on this radio on 25 August and Vice President Mohammad Hatta, did the same on 29 August. At that time, radio broadcasting was the most powerful media in order to deliver the message to reach the audiences around the world. To carry out this mission, the new Republic of Indonesia took over the former Dutch Colonial Government Radio station in Yogyakarta.

The Indonesian broadcasting across the world was named Voice of Free Indonesia On 11 September 1945, the radio station became Radio Republik Indonesia (RRI), the head organization of Voice of Indonesia. During the Indonesian National Revolution, a Scottish American woman named K'tut Tantri, who was sympathetic to the Indonesian republicans, made several English language-broadcasts on the Voice of Free Indonesia. Her broadcasts were targeted at Western listeners and she gained the nickname "Surabaya Sue" due to her support for the Indonesian nationalists. During the early days of Indonesian independence, radio broadcasting played an important role in sending the new nation's message to overseas audiences, which helped other nations recognize the sovereignty of Indonesia. In addition, the Voice of Free Indonesia was also the name of an Indonesian Republican magazine that was marketed at Western correspondents. In 1950, Voice of Free Indonesia was renamed the Voice of Indonesia.

Operations
The target audience of VOI was recently mentioned as ‘general audience’. Generally, there are three types of audience: Indonesian citizen abroad, Indonesian Diaspora and all the people across the globe.

Before, VOI serves people abroad in 11-different languages. It has several programmes that broadcast in English, French, Spanish, German, Arabic, Korean, Chinese, Japanese, Thai and Indonesian.

Until 2010, each language broadcasts 2 hours of programming a day with total of 13 hours for the whole language broadcasting. There are four main programs of VOI: News and Information, Rhythm of Archipelago; programme about Indonesian music, Getting to know Indonesia; programme about unique and typical culture of the country, and the Archipelago Sketches; programme about regional autonomy policy that implements throughout the country. These programmes are first produced in Indonesian language and then translated into 11 different languages. The content of all foreign language programs are practically the same.

Since 2018, VOI broadcasts 24 hours on internet and 12 hours on SW with 4750 and 3325 kHz. The 9525, 11785 and 15150 are inactive for the time being. In history, VOI broadcasts abroad using short wave frequencies 9525, 11785 and 15150 kHz, which it has used since it first went on the air.

Although shortwave broadcasting is the main core to deliver its product, VOI also operates a web site. Within the web site, audience may find written news in 11 different languages, as well as live streaming radio service which is started on 1 April 2008. However, the streaming service is not as fully functioned as the shortwave broadcasting.

But since 2010 audio and video streaming is fully functioned as additional medium of broadcast. VOI uses social media such as Facebook, Google+, and Twitter to update information about Indonesia. 
And just recently to provide the service to mobile and smartphone user Voice of Indonesia has launched RRI World Service Play and RRI Play Go on Google Play store.
The Voice of Indonesia has the visual program on RRI Net.

Frequencies
S.W. 3325 kHz - 10 kW (Palangkaraya Transmitter)
S.W. 4750 kHz - 50 kW (Bontosunggu, South Sulawesi Transmitter)
S.W. 9525 kHz (inactive) - 250 kW
S.W. 11785 kHz (inactive) - 250 kW
S.W. 15150 kHz (inactive) - 250 kW

17:00 – 04:00 WIB / 10:00 – 21:00 UTC

Language

SW 3325 and 4750 kHz:
 English WIB = 17:00 - 18:00, UTC 10:00 - 11:00
 Chinese WIB = 18:00 - 19:00, UTC 11:00 - 12:00
 Japanese WIB = 19:00 - 20:00, UTC 12:00 - 13:00
 English II WIB = 20:00 - 21:00, UTC 13:00 - 14:00
 Bahasa Indonesia WIB = 21:00 - 22:00, UTC 14:00 - 15:00
 Chinese II WIB = 22:00 - 23:00, UTC 15:00 - 16:00
 Arabic WIB = 23:00 - 24:00, UTC 16:00 - 17:00
 Spanish WIB = 24:00 – 01:00, UTC = 17:00 – 18:00
 German WIB = 01:00 - 02:00, UTC = 18:00 - 19:00
 English WIB = 02:.00 – 03:00, UTC = 19:00 – 20:00
 French WIB = 03:00 - 04:00, UTC = 20:00 - 21:00

See also
 TVRI World, an English television channel of TVRI

References

External links
Voice of Indonesia Website

Radio Republik Indonesia
International broadcasters
Radio stations established in 1945
1945 establishments in Indonesia